Richard Pearce may refer to:

 Richard Pearce (director) (born 1943), American film and television director
 Richard Pearce (actor) (born 1961), British actor and voice actor
 Richard Pearce (botanist) (c. 1835–1868), Victorian plant collector
 Richard Aslatt Pearce (1855–1928), Victorian clergyman
 Dickey Pearce, American baseball player

See also
 Richard Pearse (1877–1953), New Zealand aviator and inventor
 Richard Pierce (disambiguation)